Shastripuram Housing Colony is an area in the Ranga Reddy District of Telangana, India. It comes under Rajendra Nagar Circle 6 Government of Telangana. The government has begun the Mir Alam Tank water cleaning project. It is the only HUDA approved Layout Colony in Rajendra Nagar Area. It is spread across 284 Acres.it consist of 1855 plots.this colony starts from ansari road,shaik ki masjid,ak and sons collection and ends in Shastripuram.

External links

https://www.thehansindia.com/news/cities/hyderabad/2-years-and-counting-no-sign-of-sports-complex-657231

Neighbourhoods in Hyderabad, India